This article deals with the diplomatic affairs, foreign policy and international relations of Uruguay. At the political level, these matters are officially handled by the Ministry of Foreign Relations, also known as Cancillería, which answers to the President.

Overview
Uruguay traditionally has had strong political and cultural links with its neighbours and Europe. British diplomat Alfred Mitchell-Innes was Minister to Uruguay throughout the crucial years of World War I (1913–1919).

With globalization and regional economic problems, its links to North America have strengthened. Uruguay is a strong advocate of constitutional democracy, political pluralism, and individual liberties. Its international relations historically have been guided by the principles of nonintervention, multilateralism, respect for national sovereignty, and reliance on the rule of law to settle disputes. Uruguay's international relations also reflect its drive to seek export markets and foreign investment. It is a founding member of MERCOSUR. In June 1991, MERCOSUR and the United States signed the Rose Garden Agreement (also known as the "Four Plus One" Agreement). The agreement was non-operational until June 2001 when MERCOSUR invited the U.S. to discuss the feasibility of market access negotiations. The first U.S.-MERCOSUR meeting was held on September 24, 2001, and resulted in the creation of four working groups on industrial trade, e-commerce, agriculture, and investment.

Uruguay is a member of the Rio Group, an association of Latin American states that deals with multilateral security issues (under the Inter-American Treaty of Reciprocal Assistance). Uruguay's location between Argentina and Brazil makes close relations with these two larger neighbors and MERCOSUR associate members Chile and Bolivia particularly important. An early proponent of the Enterprise for the Americas Initiative, Uruguay has actively participated in the follow-up process to the periodic Summits of the Americas, especially the Free Trade Area of the Americas (FTAA). Often considered a neutral country and blessed with a professional diplomatic corps, Uruguay is often called on to preside international bodies. Most recently, Uruguay was selected to chair the FTAA and WTO agricultural committees and a Uruguayan presides over the WTO General Assembly. Uruguay also is a member of the Latin American Integration Association (ALADI), a trade association based in Montevideo that includes 10 South American countries plus Mexico and Cuba.

In 2020, the new right-wing president of Uruguay, Luis Lacalle Pou, announced that he will implement radical changes in Uruguay's foreign policy, taking a harder attitude against disputed President Nicolas Maduro's regime in Venezuela and improving relations with the U.S. The  previous left-wing government of Uruguay had recognized Maduro as Venezuela's president. President Luis Lacalle Pou also declared the presidents of Venezuela and Cuba to be "dictators."

Disputes - international: Uncontested disputes with Brazil over tiny Isla Brasilera at the mouth of the Quarai/Cuareim River near the Argentina tripoint, and, 225 kilometers upriver, over the 235 km2. Invernada River region, as to which tributary is the legitimate source of the Quarai/Cuareim River.

In the 1960s, the US Office of Public Safety helped in training Uruguayan police officers. Dan Mitrione taught torture methods used against the civilian population and the Tupamaros.

Diplomatic relations 
List of countries with which Uruguay maintains diplomatic relations: Dates are not known for Argentina, Haiti, Honduras, Jordan, Kuwait, Liechtenstein, Luxembourg, Mali, Malta, Mozambique, the Netherlands, Saudi Arabia, Venezuela and Zimbabwe.

Bilateral relations

Africa

Americas

Asia

Europe

Oceania

See also
 List of diplomatic missions in Uruguay
 List of diplomatic missions of Uruguay
 Embassy of Uruguay in Washington

References

Further reading
 Meyer, Peter J. "Uruguay: Political and Economic Conditions and US Relations." (Library Of Congress Washington Dc Congressional Research Service, 2010) online.
 Travieso, Emiliano. "United by grass, separated by coal: Uruguay and New Zealand during the First Globalization." Journal of Global History 15.2 (2020): 269–289. online

External links
Uruguayan Ministry of Foreign Relations